The Long County School District is a public school district in Long County, Georgia, United States, based in Ludowici. It serves the communities of Donald and Ludowici.

It is the designated school district for residents for grades K-12, except parts in Fort Stewart. Fort Stewart has the Department of Defense Education Activity (DoDEA) as its local school district, for the elementary level. Students at the secondary level on Fort Stewart attend public schools operated by county school districts.

Schools
The Long County School District has two elementary schools, one middle school, and one high school which is currently in Region 2-AAA.

Elementary school 
Smiley Elementary School serves grades Pre-K - 2.
McClelland Elementary School serves grades 3 - 5.

Middle school
Long County Middle School serves grades 6 - 8.

High school
Long County High School

References

External links

School districts in Georgia (U.S. state)
Education in Long County, Georgia